Raymond Guy LeBlanc (24 January 1945 – 28 October 2021) was a Canadian poet and musician.

References 

1945 births
2021 deaths
Canadian male poets
20th-century Canadian male musicians
20th-century Canadian poets